Caroline, Princess of Anhalt-Zerbst  (née Princess Caroline Wilhelmina Sophia of Hesse-Kassel; 10 May 1732 – 22 May 1759) was the first wife and consort of Frederick Augustus, Prince of Anhalt-Zerbst.

Biography 
Princess Caroline Wilhelmina Sophia of Hesse-Kassel was born on 10 May 1732 to Prince Maximilian of Hesse-Kassel and Friederike Charlotte of Hesse-Darmstadt. Her paternal grandparents were Charles I, Landgrave of Hesse-Kassel and Maria Amalia of Courland. Her maternal grandparents were Ernest Louis, Landgrave of Hesse-Darmstadt and Princess Dorothea Charlotte of Brandenburg-Ansbach.

On 17 November 1753 she married Frederick Augustus, Prince of Anhalt-Zerbst in Zerbst, becoming the consort of the Principality of Anhalt-Zerbst. The marriage was childless.

She died on 22 May 1759.

References 

1732 births
1759 deaths
18th-century German women
Caroline
Caroline
Caroline
Royal reburials